Shush Castle is located in the ruins of the ancient city of Susa (Shush) in the Khuzestan Province of Iran. It was constructed by French archaeologist Jean-Marie Jacques de Morgan in the late 1890s, as a secure base for archaeological exploration and excavation. The Castle is similar to medieval monuments in France.
The structure was built by local craftsmen with bricks taken from two other archaeological sites, the Achaemenid Darius/Dariush castle and the Elamite Choqazanbil ziggurat. It is built atop a hill ("tappeh") which may contain other relics of past times. It is an example of the pre-scientific era of archaeology, when explorers mutilated or destroyed sites in the process of examining them. 

The former French government property was taken over by the Islamic Republic after the Iranian Revolution in 1979. It is now used as a museum. Its best-known holding is a cuneiform tablet inscribed with the Code of Hammurabi, however this is now on display in the Louvre Museum in Paris, France. 

The castle was heavily damaged by Iraqi bombs during the recent Iran–Iraq War, but has since been completely restored by the Iranian government.

Gallery

See also
Iranian architecture

Architecture in Iran
Castles in Iran
Qajar castles
Buildings and structures in Khuzestan Province
Castle architecture
Medieval French architecture
Museums in Iran
Tourist attractions in Khuzestan Province
National works of Iran